Laurel Hill is a census-designated place in Fairfax County, Virginia, United States. The population as of the 2010 census was 6,855. Formerly part of the Lorton CDP, it comprises most of what was formerly the Lorton Reformatory grounds, which were purchased by Fairfax County in 2002 following the prison's closing and redeveloped as a new suburban community. The name "Laurel Hill" was adopted from Laurel Hill House, an 18th-century structure which had served as the residence of the Superintendent of the Reformatory, and originally was the home of Revolutionary War patriot William Lindsay.

Geography
Laurel Hill is in southern Fairfax County and is bordered to the northwest by Crosspointe, to the north by Newington Forest, to the east by Lorton, and to the south by Prince William County.

References

Census-designated places in Fairfax County, Virginia
Washington metropolitan area
Census-designated places in Virginia